James Simpson (c. 1792 – 17 April 1857) was born in England and arrived in Van Diemen's Land (now Tasmania) in April 1825 on board the Elizabeth.

In March 1827 he was appointed police magistrate at Norfolk Plains and later at Campbell Town. In 1832 he moved to Hobart as commissioner of the Land Board. Dissatisfied with his prospects in Tasmania, Simpson joined the Port Phillip Association and in February 1836 offered his resignation to Lieutenant-governor Arthur who reluctantly reported to the Colonial Office that Simpson had "been infected with the Port Phillip mania."

Simpson arrived at Melbourne in April 1836 in the barque Caledonia. As a member of the Port Phillip Association he had been allotted an area of land between the Werribee River and Station Peak, but held this for only a short time.

On 1 June 1836 the leading settlers of Port Phillip held the first public meeting at the township and by popular decision appointed Simpson as arbitrator in all disputes, except in matters relating to land with power to impose and collect fines.

In April 1837 Simpson was officially made a magistrate by William Lonsdale and later police magistrate of Melbourne a position he held for a year.

A succession of official positions followed: Chairman of the market commissioners (1841), warden of the district council of Bourke (1843), temporary sub-treasurer (1846), commissioner of Crown lands (1849), sheriff (1851). At the same time Simpson was in the forefront of the business and cultural life of the Melbourne community. He was vice-president of the first savings bank, president of the Mechanics' Institute, a director of the Bank of Australasia, managing director of the Steam Navigation Company and a first trustee of St Peter's Church.

Throughout the 1840s Simpson lived on Little Flinders Street, but later moved to a new house on Wellington Street in East Melbourne. There he died of an abscess of the liver aged 65. He was buried in the Church of England section of the Melbourne General Cemetery.

References
Australian Dictionary of Biography. Vol.2 :1788-1850. 1966 Melbourne University Press

1792 births
1857 deaths
Settlers of Melbourne
19th-century Australian public servants
19th-century Australian politicians